Big Sky Conference Championship or Big Sky Conference Tournament may refer to:

Big Sky Conference men's basketball tournament, the men's basketball championship tournament
Big Sky Conference women's basketball tournament, the women's basketball championship